The men's 56 pound weight throw event was part of the track and field athletics programme at the 1920 Summer Olympics. It was the second appearance of this event after the debut in 1904. The Intercalated Games in 1906 saw a stone throw event. The competition was held on Friday, August 20, 1920, and on Saturday, August 21, 1920.

Twelve throwers from four nations competed.

Records

These were the standing world and Olympic records (in metres) prior to the 1920 Summer Olympics.

Pat McDonald bettered the Olympic record in the qualification with 11.00 metres and in the final with 11.265 metres. As the competition has been discontinued, his Olympic record still stands.

Results

The best six throwers qualified for the final.

References

 
 

Weight throw
1920